Crispin S. Gregoire (born 1956, Commonwealth of Dominica) is a businessman from Dominica and was the Permanent Representative to the United Nations for the Commonwealth of Dominica until 2010.  He presented his credentials to Secretary-General Kofi Annan on 1 October 2002.

Career
Gregoire was Director of Consulting and Training for Africa and Latin America at BoardSource in Washington, D.C. prior to assuming his position at the United Nations. He has worked in many organizations, some of which include Program Consultant for the Ford Foundation in New York City, Program Adviser to TechnoServe, Inc. in Norwalk, Connecticut, acting director for the New York City Department of Health, Field Office Director for the Save the Children Federation in Westport, Connecticut, Associate Producer for CBS News in New York, a Program Associate for Appropriate Technology International in Washington, D.C. and an Adjunct Instructor at Brooklyn College in New York.

Education
Gregoire has a Bachelor of Arts in International Relations degree from Columbia University and a master's degree in education from Howard University. He speaks fluent English and Dominican Creole French, and is efficient in Spanish and French.

See also

List of Permanent Representatives to the UN

References

New Permanent Representative of Dominica presents credentials

External links
Permanent Mission of Dominica to the UN

1956 births
Living people
Permanent Representatives of Dominica to the United Nations
Columbia University alumni
Howard University alumni
Brooklyn College faculty